Bilalukoppa Krishnayya Sumitra, popularly known as B. K. Sumitra,  is an Indian singer known for her work in Kannada films. She is also popular for her numerous devotional and folk songs.

Personal life
Sumitra was born in Bilalukoppa near Horanadu to Gangamma and Krishnayya.  The family later moved to Shivamogga where Sumitra got trained in Carnatic Music by M. Prabhakar,  who was the brother of actress Pandaribai.

Sumitra married to M. L. Sudhakar. Her daughter Sowmya Raoh is also a playback singer,  while her son Sunil Raoh became a film actor in Kannada film industry.

Career
Sumitra was noticed by music composer G. K. Venkatesh and he made her to sing in the film Kavaleredu Kulavandu (1964). In her career spanning more than 40 years, she has worked with almost all the music composers including G. K. Venkatesh, R. Sudarsanam, Vijaya Bhaskar, M. Ranga Rao, Rajan–Nagendra and new generation musicians like Anoop Seelin. Sumitra is active in participating in musical workshops and training the students across the state.

Notable songs
 Ninnolume Emagirali Thande (Thande Makkalu)
 A Aa E Ee Kannadada - Karulina Kare (1970)
 Kareya Keli Bande -  Anuradha (1967)
 Madhura Madhuravee Manjulagana - Sathi Sukanya (1967)
 Sampige Marada - Upaasane (1947)
 Odi Baa Ododi Baa - Chakratheertha (1967)
 Maneye Brundavana - (Brundavana)
 Eddelu Manjunatha - Eddelu Manjunatha (2009)

Awards
Sumitra has honored with many awards. Some are listed here:
 2019 - Lifetime Achievement Award at KIMA Awards 
 2017 - G. V. Iyer Award by Karnataka Film Academy
 1992 - Sangeetha Nrithya Academy Award 
 1991-Karnataka Rajyotsava Award
 Kempegowda Award
 Nadoja honour and Honorary Doctorate by Kannada University, Hampi.
2021- K. Mohandev Alva and Dr. M.K. Shailaja Alva endowment Award by Kannada Sahitya Parishat

References

External links 

Living people
1941 births
Indian women classical singers
Indian women playback singers
Kannada playback singers
Singers from Karnataka
20th-century Indian women musicians
20th-century Indian musicians
21st-century Indian women musicians
21st-century Indian musicians
20th-century Indian singers
21st-century Indian singers
20th-century Indian women singers
21st-century Indian women singers
Recipients of the Rajyotsava Award 1991